A by-election was held for the New South Wales Legislative Assembly electorate of Concord on 12 March 1949 because of the death of Bill Carlton.

The Cobar by-election was held on the same day.

Dates

Result

The by-election was caused by the death of Bill Carlton.

See also
Electoral results for the district of Concord
List of New South Wales state by-elections

References

1949 elections in Australia
New South Wales state by-elections
1940s in New South Wales
March 1949 events in Australia